American Film is a movie magazine originally published by the American Film Institute (AFI) as a print publication between 1975 and 1992. The magazine emphasized analysis and deconstructionist criticism in a format similar to Film Comment magazine.

AFI re-launched the magazine as an ongoing monthly digital edition in April 2012.

See also
 List of film periodicals

References

American Film Institute
Defunct magazines published in the United States
English-language magazines
Film magazines published in the United States
Magazines established in 1975
Magazines disestablished in 1992
Monthly magazines published in the United States
Online magazines published in the United States
Online magazines with defunct print editions